My Shame Is True is the eighth studio album by Chicago-based rock band Alkaline Trio, released on April 2, 2013 on Heart & Skull and Epitaph Records. Produced by both Bill Stevenson and Jason Livermore, the album was preceded by the single, "I Wanna Be a Warhol", and was released with an accompanying EP, Broken Wing.

Inspired by a recent romantic break-up, vocalist and guitarist Matt Skiba described the record as a "pseudo-concept album" and a catharsis," stating, "I just wrote this one more as a love letter to my ex-girlfriend, or an apology note set to music." Following the album's release, Skiba noted that the album brought the couple back together.

The album received mostly favorable reviews upon its release. My Shame Is True reached twenty-four on the Billboard 200.

Writing and composition
Vocalist and guitarist Matt Skiba's lyrical contributions were influenced by a recent break-up, with Skiba noting, "On this one we didn't exactly plan on making a "personal" record — it just happened that way. I went through a lot since the last record and this one, like going straight out of a gnarly divorce into a really great, beautiful relationship that came to an end just as we started writing My Shame Is True."  "She Lied to the FBI" was inspired by Ben Affleck's film The Town.

The album's title references Elvis Costello's debut album, My Aim is True.

Release and promotion
Alkaline Trio released a lyric video for the song "I Wanna Be A Warhol" which was released as the album's lead single on February 5, 2013, later that month the band released another lyric video for the song "The Torture Doctor". A music video for the song "I, Pessimist" was released on March 6. "I Wanna Be A Warhol" was given an official video on March 8, 2013. Lyric videos for "The Temptation Of St. Anthony" and "I'm Only Here To Disappoint" were released on March 20. The band posted the entire album on YouTube on March 28. In April, the band went on a headlining UK tour with support from Bayside. Following this, the group embarked on a headlining US tour with support from Bayside between April and June. In September, the band performed at Riot Fest.

Critical response

AbsolutePunk gave the album a positive review, praising the album's production, Matt Skiba's lyrics and Dan Andriano's contributions, stating, "[My Shame Is True is the band's] tightest collection of songs since 2003’s Good Mourning. [...] Despite being fifteen years in the punk rock scene, My Shame Is True is a showcase of a band continuing to be vibrant and vital, when lesser bands have become stale and irrelevant." AllMusic's Matt Collar also gave the album a very positive review, noting, "My Shame Is True, is something of a revelation. Primarily, that revelation is that a band whose songcraft and musicianship might easily have plateaued by now is still bounding ever upward. To put it simply, this album is bonkers good."

The A.V. Club's Jason Heller issued the album with a negative review, stating, "When Skiba’s on fire, he’s one of pop-punk’s best tunesmiths; but when he’s coasting, as he is throughout My Shame Is True, his songs feel less black than beige."

Track listing 

Digital deluxe and Japanese versions of the album include all four songs from the band's Broken Wing EP, which was released on the same day as My Shame Is True.

Personnel

Alkaline Trio
Matt Skiba – guitars, vocals
Dan Andriano – bass, vocals, guitars
Derek Grant – drums, vocals

Additional musicians
Bill Stevenson - backing vocals
Brendan Kelly - backing vocals (2)
Tim McIlrath - co-lead vocals (6)

Recording personnel
Bill Stevenson - producer, engineer
Jason Livermore - producer, engineer, mixing, mastering
Andrew Berlin - engineer
Chris Beeble - engineer

Artwork
Nick Pritchard - design
Monkeybird - album photography

Charts

References

External links

My Shame Is True at YouTube (streamed copy where licensed)

Alkaline Trio albums
2013 albums
Epitaph Records albums
Albums produced by Bill Stevenson (musician)